Edward Zammit Lewis  (born 21 June 1973) is a Maltese politician within the Labour Party. He has been a member of the Maltese House of Representatives since 2013. Following the general elections held on 9 March 2013, won by the Labour Party, he was appointed to serve as Parliamentary Secretary for Competitiveness and Economic Growth. In April 2014, he was appointed Minister for Tourism, a post which he occupied up until June 2017. This was followed by his appointment as Minister for European Affairs and Equality in July 2019 till January 2020, when he was appointed Minister for Justice, Governance and Equality.

Reforms carried out
Being one of the few technocratic ministers and in his capacity as Minister for Justice and Governance he has worked on the ongoing reform in the Republic of Malta, which was lauded by both the Venice Commission and the European Commission.

Throughout his first ten months as Minister in the respective areas, Dr Edward Zammit Lewis has managed to reform the legislative and judicial institutions of which: the Attorney General, the Advocate of State, the appointment of the President of the Republic and the Chief Justice. Edward Zammit Lewis has also spearheaded the change in cultural shift to introduce a change of e-courts through digitalised system, thereby ensuring that the Maltese Judicial System is among the best of its kind - both in terms of logistics and legislation.

Since being appointed as Minister for Justice, Equality and Governance, he remained committed to achieve concrete results and enhance Malta's Reputation at the international level. From his first days in office, together with Prime Minister Robert Abela, a subcommittee on good governance was established.

The three pillars of his achievements throughout the first ten months of this tenure as Minister for Justice, are:
 1. Constitutional and institutional reforms

A historic milestone was achieved in the appointment of Chief Justice Mark Chetcuti. For the first time in the judicial and political history of the Republic the Chief Justice was appointed by a unanimous vote, even though the benchmark set by the legal reform is that of a vote in the House of Representative which should amount to two-thirds majority in favour.

This led to an unprecedented process of Constitutional and Institutional reforms. With the Prime Minister's thrust and political will, the Hon. Dr Zammit Lewis steered an extensive reform process of amendments concerning Malta's Constitution that no other Administration had the courage to undertake in Maltese modern history.

Acting upon a successful ‘structured dialogue’ with the Venice Commission in June 2020, and a favourable opinion issued by the same Commission Dr Zammit Lewis translated the proposals into legislative texts. Within two weeks he presented 10 Bills, of which 7 are now Acts of Parliament and the others are currently up for debate in parliament. The European Commission, the Council of Europe (Venice Commission) and the most influential political news agencies in Europe, all delivered excellent feedback regarding this work.

The reforms focused on the following;
 The President of the Republic is to be elected by a minimum of a 2/3 vote of the House of Representatives; 
  The Chief Justice who is to be elected after a minimum of a 2/3 vote from within the House of Representatives, presenting the President of the Republic with new executive powers in regard to the appointment of the Members of the Judiciary who are to be appointed following a recommendation of the 3 most suitable candidates by the independent Judicial Appointments Committee, additionally an important Constitutional amendments in the removal and discipline of Judges and Magistrates based on the principle that members of the Judiciary are to be judged by their own peers. This process shall now be steered by a subcommittee of the Commission for the Administration of Justice that is composed of three members of the Judicial Bench who are not members of the Commission for the Administration of Justice shall be elected from amongst judges and magistrates according to rules issued by the Commission for the Administration of Justice.

Based on all of this one further notes that parliament and politicians shall no longer be involved in these procedures. The security of tenure to the Attorney General and the State of Advocate, as now the two Constitutional roles can only be removed from office by 2/3 resolution of Parliament

Institutional reforms spearheaded by Dr Zammit Lewis include:
   The strengthening of the Permanent Commission Against Corruption (PCAC);
   New prosecutorial roles of serious crimes transferred from the Executive Police to the Attorney General:
   The PCAC, the Ombudsman, the Auditor General and the Commissioner for Standards in Public Life, all now have the power to report corrupt practices,
   The Permanent Secretaries of the Civil Service are to be chosen by the President of the Republic, acting upon the advice of the Public Service Commission, the Principal Permanent Secretary is now to be appointed by the President acting upon the advice of the Cabinet of Ministers and after consulting the Public Service Commission, a revised legal framework in regard to the role of persons of trust with quantitative and qualitative institutions.
   The Prime Minister has now the obligation to act upon the advice of the Cabinet of Ministers in various appointments of positions in the country's highest Institutions

2. Reforms in the justice sector and in the fight against organised crimes and money laundering

An important Bill against money laundering and organised crime, Bill 160 named as Proceeds of Crime, is already in the 2nd reading process and before the Parliamentary Committee for the Consideration of Bills.

Bill 160 shall be strengthening the Asset Recovery Bureau (ARB) by providing a solid legal framework to this crucial institution. This shall include the enhancement in human capital together with an investment of not less than €2.4million in the building of a specialised compound for the recovery of valuable assets emerging from proceeds of crime.

This prospective law shall also establish a section of the Civil Court for the purpose of regulating disputes relative to the confiscation of the proceeds of crime and for civil procedures for the recovery of assets constituting proceeds of crime.

-	A new office for the Commissioner of Laws

-	New offices for the Legal Aid

-	New offices for the Justice Department

-	New Office for the Mediation Centre

-	Following the separation in the office of the Attorney General, new respective physical offices were launched;

The first office which I already inaugurated is that of the Attorney General at a magnificent building, known as Admiralty House
The new office of the State Advocate at another prominent building, Casa Scaglia, shall be inaugurated by my good self in the coming weeks.

3. Efficiency of the Judicial System

The Hon. Minister Dr Edward Zammit Lewis continues to be strongly committed in enhancing the efficiency within the Courts of Justice and the Judicial Bench. This is mirrored by his work and that of the Abela Administration in regard to the following:

    A bill which, inter alia, aims to reduce the backlog of cases before the Court of Appeal (Superior Jurisdiction) by providing for the possibility of the appellate court to grant a hearing only in those cases where it considers that this is necessary. The Bill also provides for a reduced time- frame for the payment of security for costs in respect of appeals. Where such security will not be provided in time the appeal will be declared abandoned.
    Digitalising the filing of most of the majority of the criminal acts        
    Facilities of Video Conferencing in the Civil Court Halls
    Project of circa €2.2 million in expanding the Courts with a new building in Strait Street (4 new halls and 25 administrative offices)
    Extension in the retirement age of the Judicial Bench (from 65 years to 68 years)

Controversies
In January 2019, Zammit Lewis mocked Simon Busuttil's calls for an investigation into the company 17 Black in private messages to the company's owner Yorgen Fenech, who is a suspect in the 2017 assassination of Daphne Caruana Galizia. In the messages, Zammit Lewis also mocked Labour Party supporters and referred to them as dim-witted. After these messages were revealed to the public in 2021, the NGO Repubblika and the political party AD+PD called for Zammit Lewis' resignation, and Leader of the Opposition Bernard Grech announced his intention to call for a motion of no confidence in him in parliament. Zammit Lewis eventually apologised for the gaħan quip in a Facebook post while also condemning alleged acts of "political assassination of character".

Early life and career 
The Hon. Dr. Edward Zammit Lewis MP is a lawyer by profession. He was born in Pietà on 21 June 1973 and attended St Aloysius' College (Malta) in his youth.  His political career began during his academic years where he occupied the post of President of the Labour Youth Forum (Żgħażagħ Laburisti) for two consecutive years. 

He is married to Notary Public Dr. Elena Farrugia with whom he has one daughter.

References

External links

1973 births
Living people
21st-century Maltese politicians
University of Malta alumni
Government ministers of Malta
Labour Party (Malta) politicians
21st-century Maltese lawyers